Gabiriele Voduadua Lovobalavu (born Savusavu, 20 June 1985) is a Fijian rugby union player. He plays as a centre.

Lovobalavu is from Kanakana, Tunuloa in Cakaudrove Province. Prior to completing his Diploma in Teaching at Corpus Christi College, Lovobalavu pursued rugby as a career.

He played for the Sharks and Fiji Warriors in Fiji before joining Toulon in the French Top 14, in January 2008.

He was one of the youngest players selected for Fiji at the 2007 Rugby World Cup finals in France. He played against Australia and South Africa in the quarter-finals. He also competed at the 2011 Rugby World Cup in New Zealand.

On 27 February 2017, Gabriele will join English club Wasps at the Ricoh Arena in the Aviva Premiership from the 2017-18 season.

References

External links
 Toulon profile
 Scrum profile
 Fiji profile

1985 births
Living people
Fijian rugby union players
Rugby union centres
RC Toulonnais players
Wasps RFC players
Expatriate rugby union players in France
Fiji international rugby union players
Fijian expatriate rugby union players
Fijian expatriate sportspeople in France
People from Savusavu
I-Taukei Fijian people